Lisa Naylor is a Canadian politician, who was elected to the Legislative Assembly of Manitoba in the 2019 Manitoba general election. She represents the electoral district of Wolseley as a member of the New Democratic Party of Manitoba.

Prior to her election to the legislature, Naylor served as a trustee on the Winnipeg School Division board.

An out lesbian, Naylor successfully fought to have her partner recognized as a legal parent of her child in the early 2000s, prior to the legalization of same-sex marriage in Canada.

References

New Democratic Party of Manitoba MLAs
Women MLAs in Manitoba
Politicians from Winnipeg
Living people
21st-century Canadian politicians
Lesbian politicians
Canadian LGBT people in provincial and territorial legislatures
Year of birth missing (living people)
21st-century Canadian women politicians
21st-century Canadian LGBT people